Abel Kiprop Mutai (born 2 October 1988) is a Kenyan long-distance runner who specializes in the 3000 metres steeplechase.

He was born in Nandi. He won the gold medal at the 2005 World Youth Championships, a bronze medal at the 2012 Summer Olympics, seventh at the 2013 World Championship and finished ninth at the 2009 World Athletics Final.

As well as these, he won the 2000 m steeplechase at the 2007 African Junior championship.  He suffered an Achilles tendon injury which kept him out of competition for all of 2010.

His personal best times are 8:05.16 minutes in the 3000 metres, achieved in June 2006 in Lisbon; and 8:01.67 minutes in the 3000 metres steeplechase, achieved in May 2012 in Rome.

In January 2013 a video of  fellow long-distance runner Iván Fernández shoving a lost Mutai towards the finish line during the Burlada Cross Country race, rather than passing Mutai and winning the race, went viral. Fernández was globally praised for his sportsmanship.

Competition record

References

1988 births
Living people
Kenyan male long-distance runners
Kenyan male steeplechase runners
Athletes (track and field) at the 2012 Summer Olympics
Olympic athletes of Kenya
Olympic bronze medalists for Kenya
Medalists at the 2012 Summer Olympics
People from Nandi County
Olympic bronze medalists in athletics (track and field)
Athletes (track and field) at the 2011 All-Africa Games
African Games competitors for Kenya